Doug Wyer (born 16 August 1947 in Nottingham, Nottinghamshire, England) is a former international speedway rider who reached the final of the Speedway World Championship in 1976. Rode for Young Lions V Great Britain on 6 April 1976 at Leicester Stadium.

In 1980, Wyer won the South Australian Championship at the then new Speedway Park in Adelaide.

Wyer won the National League Pairs Championship with Les Collins in 1986

World Final Appearances
 1976 -  Chorzów, Silesian Stadium - 7th - 8 pts

References

1947 births
Living people
British speedway riders
English motorcycle racers
Doncaster Stallions riders
Sheffield Tigers riders
Berwick Bandits riders
Halifax Dukes riders
Edinburgh Monarchs riders
Birmingham Brummies riders